Traveling Miles is the thirteenth studio album by American jazz vocalist Cassandra Wilson. Released on the Blue Note label in 1999, it is a tribute to Miles Davis, taking many of its cues from Davis' catalog of recordings with Columbia Records. The album was nominated for the Grammy Award as Best Jazz Vocal Performance.

Reception
Jeff Simon of The Buffalo News wrote, "Cassandra Wilson is, paradoxically, very much her own woman at the same time that she may be overly in thrall to her friends. The results are bound to be some discs where her extraordinary gifts fail to connect as they should. "Travelling Miles" is one of them. It's never less than interesting but seldom more than that." A reviewer of Dusty Groove stated: "Cassandra Wilson's tribute to Miles Davis – a pretty brave and ambitious move, writing lyrics to classic Miles compositions – and a winning one! Wilson produced the record, too, and her genuine love of the material makes it worth – as does her fairly earthy, timeless production. Made in the late 90s, and it honestly hasn't aged a day. Very impressive!" Scott Yanow of AllMusic wrote: "A tribute album by Cassandra Wilson to Miles Davis seems like a very logical idea, but this CD is actually less than one would expect... her interpretations smooth down most of the melodies, robbing them of their personality."

Track listing
"Run the Voodoo Down" (Miles Davis, Cassandra Wilson) – 4:36 *
"Traveling Miles" (Wilson) – 4:52
"Right Here Right Now" (Marvin Sewell, Wilson) – 5:57
"Time After Time" (Rob Hyman, Cyndi Lauper) – 4:08
"When The Sun Goes Down" (Wilson) – 6:05
"Seven Steps" (Victor Feldman, Davis) – 6:44
"Someday My Prince Will Come" (Frank Churchill, Larry Morey) – 3:53
"Never Broken" (Wayne Shorter, Wilson) – 5:13
"Resurrection Blues (Tutu)" (Marcus Miller, Wilson) – 6:11 *
"Sky & Sea (Blue in Green)" (Davis, Wilson) – 5:24 *
"Piper" (Wilson) – 5:03
"Voodoo Reprise" (Davis, Wilson, Angelique Kidjo) – 4:15
Japanese Bonus Track
"Prancing" (Davis, Wilson) – 6:24

* Links for these tracks are to original Miles Davis recordings, from which Wilson's recordings adapt and take inspiration.

Personnel
Cassandra Wilson – vocals, acoustic guitar
Doug Wamble – acoustic guitar
Eric Lewis – piano
Jeffrey Haynes, Kevin Breit – acoustic, electric, resophonic & e-bow guitars, electric mandolin, mandocello, bazouki
Lonnie Plaxico – acoustic bass
Marcus Baylor – drums, percussion
Marvin Sewell – acoustic, classical & electric guitars, bazouki
Mino Cinelu – percussion
Perry Wilson – drums
Vincent Henry – harmonica
Dave Holland – bass
Olu Dara – cornet
Steve Coleman – alto sax
Pat Metheny – classical guitar
Angelique Kidjo – vocals
Regina Carter – violin
Stefon Harris – vibraphone

Chart positions

References

Miles Davis tribute albums
1999 albums
Blue Note Records albums
Cassandra Wilson albums
Vocal jazz albums